Gaia's Legacy is the eighth album by Italian progressive metal band Eldritch, released in 2011.

Track listing 
"Gaia's Anger" (intro) - 1:00
"Deviation" - 4:40
"Our Land" - 4:47
"Vortex of Disasters" - 4:54 
"Mother earth" - 4:48
"Everything's burning" - 4:01 
"Thinning out" - 5:20
"Like a Child" - 5:20
"Signs" - 5:49
"Thoughts of grey" - 5:37
"Thirst in our hands (Dry tears)" - 5:49
"Through Different Eyes (Fates Warning cover)" - 4:25

2011 albums
Eldritch (band) albums